Interdit d'interdire is a live, daily (4 days per week), cultural, prime-time, talk show on RT (French version) created by Frédéric Taddeï. Taddeï was the host of the show until his resignation on 23 February 2022 in response to Russia's recognition of the Donetsk and Luhansk breakaway states immediately before the 2022 Russian invasion of Ukraine. Following the beginning of the 2022 Russian invasion of Ukraine, RT was banned by the European Commission on all the territory of the European Union and RT France ceased activities on 2 March 2022.

The show is named after the aphorism Il est interdit d'interdire ! created by Jean Yanne and which became one of the popular slogans during May 1968.

References

French television talk shows